Gu is a Chinese-language surname, usually spelled as "Ku" or "Koo" in Taiwan. In 2013 it was found to be the 340th most common surname, shared by 138,000 people or 0.010% of the population in China.

Notable people
 Koo family of Lukang, a prominent Taiwanese-Japanese business family who founded the Koos Group known as 和信集團
 Koo Hsien-jung
 Jeffrey Koo Sr. (Ambassador-at-Large, Chairman of Chinatrust Bank, and "Father of Credit Cards")
 Koo Chen-fu (Taiwanese diplomat and businessman)
 Chester Koo
 Koo Kwang-ming (1926–2023)
 Leslie Koo
 Richard Koo
 Nono Ku, Taiwanese actress and model
 Gu Hongyu (辜轰余; January 31, 1971 in Beijing) a retired male beach volleyball player from the People's Republic of China
 Koh Lay Huan (辜禮歡甲, died 1826), Chinese-born businessman who became the first Kapitan China of Penang
 Gu Jiaming (Chinese: 辜家明) a retired female badminton player from China

References

Individual Chinese surnames
Crime